The Jats are one of the largest communities found in Azad Kashmir, making up the majority of the population of Mirpur District, and forming a large part of the populations of Bhimber and Kotli districts.

Language 
The Kotli, Dadyal and Chakswari Jats speak in a broad Pahari dialect, whilst those of Mirpur City and its immediate surrounds speak in a dialect which resembles the Pothwari spoken in the Potohar Plateau region of Punjab, Pakistan.

Notable people
Barrister Sultan Mehmood Chaudhry Thathal, former Prime Minister of Azad Jammu and Kashmir.
Chaudhry Abdul Majid, former Prime Minister of Azad Jammu and Kashmir.

See also
 Jats
 Muslim Jat of Punjab
 Ethnic groups of Azad Kashmir
 Sikh Jats

References

Jat clans of Jammu and Kashmir